The discography of Argentine recording artist Nicki Nicole consists of two studio album, twenty two singles and twenty one music videos. She gained popularity with her singles such as "Wapo Traketero", "Nicki Nicole: Bzrp Music Sessions, Vol. 13" with Argentine record producer Bizarrap, "Colocao", "Verte" with Argentine singer Dread Mar I and Bizarrap and "No Toque Mi Naik" with the Puerto Rican singer Lunay. Nicole participated in the song "Mamichula" alongside Argentine rapper Trueno and Argentine producer Bizarrap for Trueno's debut studio album called Atrevido. She also participated in the remix of "Ella No Es Tuya" with the Dominican rapper Rochy RD and the Puerto Rican rapper and singer Myke Towers.

Her debut studio album Recuerdos was released on November 8, 2019, through Dale Play Records.

Albums

Studio albums

Singles

As lead artist

Promotional singles

Other charted songs

Music videos

Notes

References

Discographies of Argentine artists
Hip hop discographies